Sookerating Air Force Station is an Indian Air Force base located at Sookerating in the state of Assam, India.  It is a secondary airport for the Indian Air Force, which operates much more actively from other air bases in the region..

During World War II, the airfield was used as a transport base by the United States Army Air Forces Tenth Air Force and Air Transport Command.  From the airfield, numerous C-46 Commando aircraft flew north into China over "the Hump" to resupply Allied forces.   The airfield was also used as a combat fighter airfield in 1942 to defend the Assam Valley against Japanese forces advancing from Burma.

References

 Maurer, Maurer (1983). Air Force Combat Units Of World War II. Maxwell AFB, Alabama: Office of Air Force History. .

External links

Indian Air Force bases
Airfields of the United States Army Air Forces in British India
Airports in Assam
1940s establishments in India
Airports with year of establishment missing